The Ven Henry Walsham How (born Whittington, Shropshire 17 May 1856died Malvern Link 29 November 1923) was Archdeacon of Halifax from 1917 until his death.

The son of William Walsham How the inaugural Bishop of Wakefield, he was educated at Marlborough; Wadham College, Oxford and Leeds Clergy School.  He was ordained deacon in 1879, and priest in 1880.

After curacies in Stoke-on-Trent  and Haughton; How held incumbencies in Mirfield and Meltham. He was Rural Dean of Huddersfield from 1905 to 1917 and a Canon of Wakefield Cathedral from 1917 to 1923.

On 4 August 1886 he married Katharine Hutchinson: they had three sons and one daughter.

References

Archdeacons of Halifax
19th-century English Anglican priests
20th-century English Anglican priests
People educated at Marlborough College
Alumni of Leeds Clergy School
Alumni of Wadham College, Oxford
1856 births
1923 deaths
Clergy from Shropshire
Freemasons of the United Grand Lodge of England